Wu Youxun (26 April 1897 – 30 November 1977), also known as Y. H. Woo, was a Chinese physicist.  His courtesy name was Zhèngzhī.

Biography 
Wu graduated from the Department of Physics of Nanjing Higher Normal School (later renamed National Central University and Nanjing University), and was later associated with the Department of Physics at Tsinghua University. He served as president of National Central University and Jiaotong University in Shanghai. When he was a graduate student at the University of Chicago he studied x-ray and electron scattering, and verified the Compton effect which gave Arthur Compton the Nobel Prize in Physics.

Awards 
In 2000, the Chinese Physical Society established five prizes, in recognition of five pioneers of modern physics in China. The Wu Youxun Prize is awarded to physicists in nuclear physics.

References

1897 births
1977 deaths
Boxer Indemnity Scholarship recipients
Educators from Jiangxi
Members of Academia Sinica
Members of the Chinese Academy of Sciences
Nanjing University alumni
National Central University alumni
Academic staff of the National Southwestern Associated University
People from Yichun, Jiangxi
Physicists from Jiangxi
Presidents of National Central University
Presidents of Nanjing University
Presidents of Shanghai Jiao Tong University
Academic staff of Shanghai Jiao Tong University
Academic staff of Tsinghua University